Thomas Strangways may refer to:
 Thomas Strangways (1643–1713), Member of Parliament for Poole and for Dorset
 Thomas Strangways (died 1726), Member of Parliament for Bridport and for Dorset
 Thomas Bewes Strangways (1809–1859), explorer